Yitzhak Israeli (Yitzchak Yisraeli) is a Sephardi rabbi, Talmudic scholar, and Orthodox halakhist. He is the Av Beit Din of Torah U'Mishpat in Brooklyn, New York. He serves as the Rabbi of the Sephardic Center of Mill Basin, a predominantly Syrian Jewish congregation.

Early life 
Born in Jerusalem, Israeli studied at Yeshivat Tifrach. He was a prominent student of Ben Zion Abba Shaul and Ovadia Yosef. In 1998 he moved to New York, where he received his semikha (rabbinic ordination) from Eliyahu Ben Haim.

Community work 
Soon after he received his semikha, Israeli began to serve as a dayan in the beth din headed by Ben Haim in Queens. In 2000 he was appointed rabbi of Congregation Sha'are Emunah in Cedarhurst, where he served until 2009. From 2008 to 2010, Israeli served as a rosh yeshiva (dean) in Yeshivah Beer Yitzhak in Beitar Illit, West Bank.

In 2001, Israeli established the Sephardic Beth Medrash and Congregation of Rockland County in Wesley Hills, New York, which he led until 2012. In 2012 he was appointed rabbi of the Sephardic Center of Mill Basin. Israeli taught halakha (Jewish law) and dayanut in several kollelim (advanced institutes) in Brooklyn and Queens. Currently, he serves as Rosh Kollel (head of the kollel) in Congregation Beth Gavriel in Queens.

Israeli is leading several charities and mutual help organizations. He established Be'er Yitzhak Foundation, an organization that helps the needy in Israel, as well as Jewish education organizations in Israel. He is among the rabbis leading the Bikur Cholim Website Of Mill Basin organization.

Israeli's theory of halakha is based upon the methods of Ovadia Yosef. His halakhic work deals with the most complicated issues in Even Ha'ezer, as well as other parts of the Shulchan Aruch.

Israeli had been fighting the issue of assimilation in the Bukharian community. He works, together with other community leaders, on transferring children from public schools to Jewish schools in Queens.

Israeli is recognized and honored by other communities' leaders and was among the speakers at the Agudath Israel of America 2018 convention. He is recognized and honored by the Bukharian community leaders in Israel and was invited to honor the scholarship awarding event by the Bukharian Community in Israel in April 2022.

Works 
Since the beginning of his career, Israeli focused on the issuing halakha rulings. Some of his early works were published in several issues of the halakhic journal Kol Me'heikhal. His rulings deal with all the four parts of Shulchan Aruch.

Israeli's first book, published in 2014 and titled MeAvnei HaMakom (Part 1), deals with several halakhic issues including contemporary Shabbat issues, marriage, gittin (divorce documents) and agunot. The book received accolades from Ben Haim and Zalman Nechemia Goldberg.

His second book, Yode'ei Binah, was published in 2016, and deals with the determination of zmanim (halakhic times of the day), and rulings that stem from those determinations.

The exact responsibilities and obligations of Yitzhak Israeli in his capacity as Chief Rabbi to Bukharian Jews throughout the United States and Canada are undisclosed and generally presumed to be nominal. Yitzhak Israeli is widely unknown to any Bukharian Jews outside of the sphere of influence of CHAZAQ, an ultra-Orthodox outreach organization in Queens, NY. Yitzhak Israeli is not of Bukharian Jewish heritage and does not speak Bukharian or Russian, which are the predominant languages of Bukharian Jews.

References

External links 
 Lectures at Sha'arei Yeshuah Mitzion
 MeAvnei HaMakom Book in HebrewBooks

Israeli emigrants to the United States
Orthodox rabbis from New York City
Sephardi rabbis
Living people
Year of birth missing (living people)
21st-century American rabbis